"Better Man" is a song by American country group Little Big Town. It was released on October 20, 2016, as the lead single from the group's eighth studio album, The Breaker (2017). American singer-songwriter Taylor Swift wrote the song, intending to include it on her fourth studio album, Red (2012), but the song did not make the final track-list. She passed the song to Little Big Town in 2016, believing the group's vocal harmonies suited it.

Produced by Jay Joyce, "Better Man" was first performed live at the 50th CMA Awards on November 2, 2016. The song won Song of the Year and was nominated for Single of the Year, and Music Video of the Year at the 2017 CMA Awards. The song won a Grammy Award for Best Country Duo/Group Performance and was nominated for Best Country Song at the 60th Annual Grammy Awards.

Swift recorded her version of "Better Man", subtitled "Taylor's Version (from the Vault)", for her 2021 re-recorded album, Red (Taylor's Version). The version was produced by Swift and Aaron Dessner.

Background

The song was written by Taylor Swift. According to group member Karen Fairchild, Swift thought of the group because of the harmonies, and sent the song to them. According to Swift, the song was originally intended for her fourth studio album Red (2012). An unnamed source from Us Weekly reported that she sent it to the group in July 2016.

"Better Man" has a play length of 4 minutes and 21 seconds. The song is in a slow tempo of 72 beats per minute, written with a 4/4 time signature. It is in the key of F major, with a chord pattern of F-C-B-B-B. Karen Fairchild's lead vocal spans from F to B.

Swift revealed in August 2021 that she would be recording her rendition of "Better Man" for the 2021 re-recording of Red.

Music video
An accompanying music video was directed by Becky Fluke and Reid Long and premiered on November 1, 2016. Set in a rural household, the video depicts three generations of single parents whose partners ultimately leave them. The cycle is presumably broken at the end, when Philip Sweet's character has a baby girl and makes an effort to be a better role model.

Critical reception
Kevin John Coyne of Country Universe rated the song "A", saying that "It’s a concept that is grounded in so much truth that I’m amazed I’ve never heard it approached this way before" and "The writers do a great job of capturing both why [the song's narrator] stayed so long and why she had to leave, and all of the conflicting feelings that go along with that." Taste of Country writer Billy Dukes also praised the song, saying that "This song isn’t as jarring as some of the quartet’s most recent hits. In fact, the mistreatment of women is only vaguely alluded to — there’s no one line that burns the hair off the back of your neck. Jay Joyce’s arrangement is soft but not stark. It’s among his more mainstream productions. Still, it’s clear Fairchild’s protagonist is reeling from a love that went very, very wrong." Taste of Country ranked it the 42nd best country song of the 2010s.

Accolades

Commercial performance
The song sold 6,000 copies on its first day of release, enough to allow the song to enter the Hot Country Songs chart at No. 41.  It sold 20,000 the following week, and rose to No. 20 in the chart. In its third week it sold a further 47,000 copies and climbed further to No. 6. On the Hot Country Songs chart dated February 11, 2017, "Better Man" reached number one, earning the group their third leader. It spent two weeks at No. 1 before being dethroned by "Body Like A Back Road" by Sam Hunt. The song was certified platinum in the United States by the RIAA on August 23, 2017. The song has sold 772,000 copies in the United States as of February 2018.

Credits and personnel 
Credits adapted from Tidal.
 Little Big Town – vocals
 Taylor Swift – songwriter
 Jay Joyce – producer, programmer, bass, drums, guitar, keyboards, percussion, mixer
 Jaxon Hargrove – assistant recording engineer
 Jimmy Mansfield – assistant recording engineer
 Jason Hall – engineer
 Richard Dodd – mastering engineer

Charts

Weekly charts

Year-end charts

Decade-end charts

Certifications

Other versions
Swift performed "Better Man" at Club Nomadic in Houston as part of the DirecTV Special, Super Saturday Night on February 4, 2017. She also performed it on March 31, 2018, at the Bluebird Café in Nashville, Tennessee, and on August 25, 2018, at her Reputation Stadium Tour stop at Nissan Stadium in Nashville. On October 12, 2021, Swift's original demo for "Better Man" widely leaked online.

On February 15, 2017, Chase Bryant recorded a cover version of the song, which changed the grammatical narrative from second person to first. Bryant's rendition was described favorably by both Billboard and Rolling Stone for the change in the song's perspective, as well as the harmonies provided by Runaway June.

"Better Man (Taylor's Version)"

Swift recorded "Better Man", subtitled "(Taylor's Version) (From the Vault)", for her second re-recorded album, Red (Taylor's Version), released on November 12, 2021, through Republic Records. The re-recorded "Better Man" was produced by Swift and Aaron Dessner. It also features lap steel guitar and the London Contemporary Orchestra, arranged by Bryce Dessner.

Charts

References

2016 songs
2016 singles
Little Big Town songs
Songs written by Taylor Swift
Song recordings produced by Jay Joyce
Capitol Records Nashville singles
Country ballads
2010s ballads
Taylor Swift songs
Song recordings produced by Taylor Swift
Song recordings produced by Aaron Dessner